The 9th Regiment, Tennessee Infantry was an infantry regiment from Tennessee in the American Civil War. Notable battle the regiment was involved in include the Battle of Shiloh.

See also
List of Tennessee Confederate Civil War units

References

9th Tennessee Infantry Regiment
9th Tennessee Infantry Regiment
 9th Tennessee Infantry Regiment